Overspill parking is the parking of vehicles beyond a defined area specifically designed for this purpose.  It can occur because provided parking spaces are insufficient for demand or considered unsatisfactory, and may have unintended consequences on its surroundings.  Additional official parking may be provided for an event, or at some distance from the intended destination.

Overspill car parking may simply be parking further away from a place than desirable. In some circumstances it may involve parking violations or other unauthorised or anti-social parking such as double parking, parking on verges or on sidewalks and can on occasions create difficulties for others.

Available parking may be insufficient, unsuitable, expensive or otherwise undesirable. Parking may be limited because the urban form historically made little provision for the parking of private vehicles, or because the transport authority zoning policies consciously limit the provision of parking spaces to discourage car use.  Overspill parking is commonplace near shops, schools, hospitals, sports grounds and train/metro stations and at other locations that attract people and vehicles.  Commuters prevented from parking for the day close to train stations may resort to parking elsewhere, for example on side streets, verges or other locations.

Overspill parking may conflict with other road users including other motorists, emergency vehicles, cyclists, pedestrians and members of various vulnerable groups including the blind, wheel-chair users and people with small children.  Vehicles parked on grass, authorised or not, can turn the area to mud in wet weather and parking on sidewalks can cause damage and additional maintenance/repair costs. Such cases may prompt preventative action.

Reaction 

Policy makers may choose to accept overspill parking as inevitable, they may choose to provide more parking spaces or may introduce legislative or physical measures to control the places where vehicles can be parked.  Design elements may include bollards, high kerbs, railings, benches, raised planters, and other street furniture to prevent parking on footways.

Restrictions can limit parking to particular times of day, for limited periods of time, and may discriminate among users. Examples include residential zoned parking, disabled parking bays, metered bays, and no-parking restrictions.

In a referendum in Amsterdam in 1992 the population voted for reducing the level of parking provision in the city.

More parking spaces 
The relevant authority will sometimes attempt to provide additional parking opportunities and direct users to those facilities. Consideration was given to overspill parking when Chelsea Football Club was developing the 'Chelsea Football Club Academy' on days when the reserve team were expected to play there and the popular seaside town of Southwold creates additional parking during busy summer periods.

Information campaigns 
Many transport authorities run campaigns to highlight the costs and inconvenience of overspill parking.

Living Streets in the United Kingdom runs a 'Campaign for combat pavement parking' suggesting various things that people can do to reduce the problem.

Voluntary or compulsory 'Car Exclusion zones' around schools at school drop-off/collection times are used to create a more attractive environment for pedestrians and discourage parents from using cars to schools where there is insufficient space to accommodate them.

Streetfilms has produced a number of videos highlighting the issues, highlighting the benefits to pedestrians if the issue is addressed and approaches that can be adopted.

Regional issues

United Kingdom
The House of Commons Transport Select Committee published a report on 'Parking Policy and Enforcement' in June 2006. The report acknowledged that the problem of parking on pavements and in particular parking outside schools, hospital entrances and on corners, junctions and bus stops was "a large one and that a major effort would be required to enforce the law". It criticised the Department for Transport for what it saw as a 'do-nothing' attitude to the problem and said that the government "must grip the problem of pavement parking once and for all and ensure that it is outlawed throughout the country".

References

Further reading
Planning Policy Guidance 13 Official UK planning policy covering the issue of overspill parking.
East of England Spatial Strategy Includes Regional transport Strategy which outlines the official parking strategy for the East of England. See policy T14.
P0110Parking.pdf - A comprehensive summary from the perspective of a pedestrian advocacy group in the UK (Living Streets). (registration required)

Parking
Transportation planning